Dorsoduro is one of the six sestieri of Venice, in northern Italy.

Dorsoduro includes the highest land areas of the city and also Giudecca island and Isola Sacca Fisola. Its name derives from the Italian for "hard ridge", due to its comparatively high, stable land.

History
The original heart of the area was the Giudecca Canal, along which buildings were constructed from the sixth century. By the eleventh century, settlement had spread across to the Grand Canal, while later religious buildings including the Basilica of Santa Maria della Salute and the Zattere quay are now its main landmarks.

In the nineteenth century the Accademia was set up in Dorsoduro and the Ponte dell'Accademia linked it to San Marco, making it an expensive area, popular with foreign residents. The western quarter end and the Giudecca, became industrialised around this time.

Main sights
Landmarks and visitor attractions in Dorsoduro include:

Ca' Foscari
Ca' Rezzonico
Campo San Barnaba
Campo San Gregorio
Campo Santa Margherita
Gallerie dell'Accademia
Peggy Guggenheim Collection
Il Redentore (church) 
Le Zitelle
Ospedale Giustinian
Palazzo Ariani
Palazzo Brandolin Rota
Palazzo Dario
Palazzo Giustinian Recanati
Palazzo Mocenigo Gambara
Palazzo Orio Semitecolo Benzon
Palazzo Zenobio
Punta della Dogana
Dogana da Mar 
Santa Maria della Salute (church)
San Pantalon (church)
San Trovaso (church)
Santa Maria del Carmelo (church)
San Sebastiano (church)
Scuola Grande dei Carmini
Church of Ognissanti

External links
 

 
Sestieri of Venice
Geography of Venice